The 1968 season was the seventh season of national competitive association football in Australia and 85th overall.

National teams

Australia national soccer team

Results and fixtures

Friendlies

Cup competitions

Australia Cup

The competition began on 29 March 1968. Nineteen clubs had entered the competition with the final two clubs Sydney Hakoah and Melbourne Hakoah qualifying for the Final. Sydney Hakoah won 6–1 on aggregate over Melbourne Hakoah.

Final

First leg

Second leg

References

External links
 Football Australia official website

1968 in Australian soccer
Seasons in Australian soccer